I Rose Up Slowly is the second extended play (EP) by Filipina singer Clara Benin. Its title comes from the fourth song of the EP, "I Rose Up Slowly". The EP consists of five original tracks, all were written by Benin herself.

Background
After releasing her first EP Riverchild, Benin took a break with her music career. Benin then returned in 2018 and started recording her second EP, I Rose Up Slowly.

In October 2018, Benin released "Wrestle", the only single in the EP.

Track listing
5 songs were written by Benin.

References

External links

2019 EPs
Clara Benin albums